Chen Nan-kuang is a Taiwanese economist and academic.  He became the Deputy Governor of the Central Bank of the Republic of China in March 2018.

Education
Chen obtained his bachelor's and master's degree in economics from National Taiwan University (NTU) in 1987 and 1989 respectively. He then obtained his doctoral degree in economics from University of Minnesota in the United States.

Early careers
Chen was the assistant professor of the department of economics of NTU from August 1997 until July 2003. In August 2003 until July 2008, he was an associate professor within the same department of the university, and finally he became a professor of the department in August 2008, which continued until March 2018, when he left that position for the Central Bank of the Republic of China in Tawain.

References

1964 births
Living people
20th-century Taiwanese economists
Central bankers
21st-century Taiwanese economists